James Dunwoody Brownson De Bow (July 20, 1820 – February 27, 1867) was an American publisher and statistician, best known for his influential magazine De Bow's Review, who also served as superindendant of the U.S. Census from 1853 to 1855. He always spelled "De Bow" as two words.

Biography
J. D. B. De Bow was born on July 20, 1820, in Charleston, South Carolina, the second son of Mary Bridget Norton and Garret De Bow. James' father, Garret, was born in New York City, New York about 1775 to a Dutch-Huguenot father who immigrated to the United States at an unknown date. His mother, Mary Bridget, was born into an elite planter family from South Carolina. Her grandfather was Capt. John Norton, an early settler on the Carolina Coast. Her father, William, was a Revolutionary Soldier.

A resident of New Orleans, De Bow used his magazine to advocate the expansion of Southern agriculture and commerce so that the Southern economy could become independent of the North. He warned constantly of the South's "colonial" relationship with the North, one in which the South was at a distinct disadvantage.

In 1866, he became the first president of the proposed Tennessee and Pacific Railroad, a business venture that he would not live to see fulfilled. Less than a year later, De Bow died of peritonitis, which he contracted on a trip to visit his brother in New Jersey.

References

Further reading
 Crider, Jonathan B., "De Bow's Revolution: The Memory of the American Revolution in the Politics of the Sectional Crisis, 1850–1861," American Nineteenth Century History vol. 10 (Sept. 2009), pp. 317–332.
 Kvach, John F. De Bow's Review: The Antebellum Vision of a New South. Lexington, KY: University Press of Kentucky, 2013.
 Statistical view of the United States, embracing its territory, population--white, free colored, and slave moral and social condition, industry, property, and revenue; the detailed statistics of cities, towns and counties; being a compendium of the seventh census, to which are added the results of every previous census, beginning with 1790, in comparative tables, with explanatory and illustrative notes, based upon the schedules and other official sources of information. By J.D.B. De Bow, superintendent of the United States Census. Washington, A.O.P. Nicholson, Public Printer, 1854

External links

 
 The Cause of the South: Selections from De Bow's Review, 1846-1867

1820 births
1867 deaths
American magazine publishers (people)
Businesspeople from New Orleans
19th-century American railroad executives
Deaths from peritonitis
United States Census Bureau people
American proslavery activists
American Fire-Eaters